Sammika Ruwan (born 14 May 1985) is a Sri Lankan cricketer. He made his Twenty20 debut on 17 August 2004, for Panadura Sports Club in the 2004 SLC Twenty20 Tournament. He made his first-class debut for Panadura Sports Club in the 2004–05 Premier Trophy on 1 October 2004.

References

External links
 

1985 births
Living people
Sri Lankan cricketers
Badureliya Sports Club cricketers
Panadura Sports Club cricketers
Saracens Sports Club cricketers
Place of birth missing (living people)